Edward Lawrence Casey (May 16, 1894 – July 26, 1966) was an American football player and coach.  He played college football at Harvard University and was inducted to the College Football Hall of Fame in 1968.  Casey was MVP of the 1920 Rose Bowl Game in which Harvard defeated Oregon 7-6.  In recognition of his Rose Bowl accomplishments, Casey was inducted into the Rose Bowl Hall of Fame in 2019. Casey also played professional football in 1920 for the Buffalo All-Americans; he was also the head coach of the Boston Redskins of the National Football League (NFL) in 1935 and the Boston Bears of the third American Football League (AFL) in 1940.

Early life
Casey was born in Natick, Massachusetts on May 16, 1894 to James Francis and Ellen (Ahern) Casey.  He attended Phillips Exeter Academy where he graduated in 1915.

College coaching career
Casey started his football coaching career in 1920 at Mount Union College in Alliance, Ohio. In 1922, he moved on to Tufts College in Medford, Massachusetts where he coached until 1925.  That year, he moved on to Harvard University.  He was the Harvard freshmen coach from 1926 to 1928, the backfield coach from 1929 to 1930 and head coach from 1931 to 1934.

Head coaching record

College

References

External links
 

1894 births
1966 deaths
American football halfbacks
Boston Redskins head coaches
Buffalo All-Americans players
Harvard Crimson football coaches
Harvard Crimson football players
Mount Union Purple Raiders football coaches
Tufts Jumbos football coaches
All-American college football players
College Football Hall of Fame inductees
Phillips Exeter Academy alumni
People from Natick, Massachusetts
Players of American football from Massachusetts
Sportspeople from Middlesex County, Massachusetts